Suicide Tuesday is the second studio album produced by DJ Hyper or simply known "Hyper" and was released on 13 October 2008.

Track listing

 "Centre Attraction" featuring Jim Davies – 3:39
 "Let Me In" featuring Leeroy Thornhill – 3:32
 "I'm an Image" featuring Charlotte Cooper - 4:08
 "Jabba" - 3:45
 "Touch" featuring Leeroy Thornhill - 4:07
 "Replica" featuring Odissi - 4:21
 "Deteriorate"  featuring J.Ross & K.Pepper - 3:36
 "No Rockstars" featuring J.Ross & S.Evans - 5:34
 "Push It" featuring Leeroy Thornhill - 4:21
 "I'm Sick" featuring Axe-Girl - 5:52

2008 albums
DJ Hyper albums